"Funkytown" is a song by the American disco/funk band Lipps Inc., released in 1980 as the second single from their 1979 debut album, Mouth to Mouth. It was successful globally, reaching top spots in places such as the United States, West Germany, Canada, Austria, Switzerland, Norway, the Netherlands, and Australia.

Composition
It was written by musician, composer, and record producer Steven Greenberg and sung by Cynthia Johnson. The lyrics pine for a metaphorical place that will "keep me movin', keep me groovin' with some energy," while the band members were dreaming of relocating from Minneapolis to New York City. It is in the key of C major.

Music videos
"Funkytown" has at least two music videos. In one, a black singer mimes the vocals and some women dance in a pub. In another video, Debbie Jenner, who fronted the band in the Netherlands and West Germany, dances while miming the vocals. Johnson claims on her website that she "was never asked to perform a video of 'Funkytown'".

Track listings
 7" single
"Funkytown" – 4:00
"All Night Dancing" – 3:10

 12" single
"Funkytown" – 7:50
"All Night Dancing" – 8:20

Reception

Critical
In 1997, Canadian DJ John Acquaviva listed it with his top 10 tracks, saying, "It's always been one of my favourite songs. It's got an amazing bassline that sounds great on a good system and people love it. Some people in Germany I know are reissuing it."

In 2009, VH1 ranked it at number 37 on its list of the 100 Greatest One-Hit Wonders of the 1980s.

In 2018, Time Out listed it number 44 of "The 100 best party songs".

In 2018, ThoughtCo placed it seventh on its list of "25 Best Dance Pop Songs of All Time".

Charts
"Funkytown" entered the US Billboard Hot 100 on March 29, 1980, and spent four weeks at number one, from May 31 to June 21, 1980. It hit the number one spot on the disco chart in 1980. It reached no. 2 in the United Kingdom, Sweden, and the US soul chart. The song is Lipps, Inc.'s only American Top 40 hit.

Weekly

Year-end

All-time

Certifications and sales

Pseudo Echo version

In 1986, "Funkytown" was covered by Australian band Pseudo Echo in rock form, including a guitar solo in the middle. It reached no. 6 on the US Hot 100 chart and spent seven weeks at no. 1 in Australia. Like Lipps Inc, it is Pseudo Echo's only US Top 40 hit.

Track listings
7" single (EMI 1883)
"Funkytown" – 3:40
"Lies Are Nothing" – 3:58

12" / Maxi (ED 237) / (RCA 5217–7)
Side A: "Funky Town" (Dance Mix) – 6:32
Side B: "Funkytown" – 3:40
Side B: "Lies Are Nothing" – 3:58

Charts

Weekly

Year-end

Certifications

See also

List of number-one singles in Australia during the 1980s
Lists of number-one singles (Austria)
List of Billboard Hot 100 number-one singles of 1980
List of Cash Box Top 100 number-one singles of 1980
List of number-one singles of 1980 (Canada)
List of number-one singles of 1987 (Canada)
List of Dutch Top 40 number-one singles of 1980
List of European number-one hits of 1980
List of number-one singles of 1980 (France)
List of number-one hits of 1980 (Germany)
List of number-one singles from the 1980s (New Zealand)
List of number-one songs in Norway
List of number-one singles of the 1980s (Switzerland)
List of number-one dance singles of 1980 (U.S.)

References

External links

1979 songs
1980 debut singles
1986 singles
Lipps Inc. songs
Pseudo Echo songs
St. Vincent (musician) songs
Casablanca Records singles
Songs about New York City
Billboard Hot 100 number-one singles
Cashbox number-one singles
Dutch Top 40 number-one singles
European Hot 100 Singles number-one singles
Number-one singles in Australia
Number-one singles in Austria
Number-one singles in France
Number-one singles in Germany
Number-one singles in Israel
Number-one singles in New Zealand
Number-one singles in Norway
Number-one singles in Spain
Number-one singles in Switzerland
RCA Records singles
RPM Top Singles number-one singles
Ultratop 50 Singles (Flanders) number-one singles